Ratones Paranoicos is an Argentine rock band, formed in 1983  in Buenos Aires, Argentina. The group is influenced by rhythm-and-blues music, and their prime influence were The Rolling Stones, with whom they have shared Andrew Loog Oldham as a producer.

Members 
It was originally formed by Juanse (vocals and guitar), Pablo “Maldito" Memi (bass), Paul "Sarcófago" Cano (guitar) and Rubén "Roy" Quiroga (drums). In October 2007, Fabian "von" Quintiero split from the band after being a member since 1997. In his place came Pablo Memi, returning to the original line-up. The band was once supported by Charly García. Former Rolling Stone guitarist Mick Taylor has appeared with them.

Discography 

 Ratones Paranoicos (1986)
 Los chicos quieren rock (1988)
 Furtivos (1989)
 Tómalo o déjalo (1990)
 Fieras lunáticas (1991)
 Hecho en Memphis (1993)
 Planeta Paranoico (1996)
 Electroshock (1999)
 Los chicos quieren más (2001)
 Girando (2003)
 Ratones Paranoicos (2009)

See also 
Argentine rock

Notes

References

External links 
 

Rock en Español music groups
Argentine rock music groups